Laurentius Christophori Hornaeus or also known as Lars Christophri Hornæus (1645 – April 27, 1719), was a priest of the Church of Sweden. He was the parish vicar of Torsåker and Ytterlännäs, Sweden, and known for his role during the Torsåker witch trials.

Life

He was born as Lars Christoffersson in Härnösand in 1645. In this time period Sweden, it was common for students and priests to use the Latinized form of their names, and their birthplace was sometimes added as a family name. Hornaeus most likely is the Latinized version of Härnösand. Lars started his theological studies in the 1660s, and in 1667 he and his brother Petrus were both studying together at the University of Uppsala. 

Lars was ordained in 1672 and was then employed as an assistant or curate, to the "assistant minister" Olaus Erici Rufinius (1637–1672) in Ytterlännäs, the parish for the city of Torsåker.  He was also responsible for the annex parish in the Dal Hundred. Olaus Rufinius died in 1672, and Lars was appointed as the new "assistant minister" of Ytterlännäs.  He succeeded as the parish vicar by the customary method of widow conservation, in which a clergyman succeeded to a parish by marrying the widow or daughter of his predecessor.  In this case, Olaus Erici Rufinius was a widower when he died, and Laurentius Christophori Hornæus married Rufinius' daughter named Brita Olofsdotter Rufinia (1651–1730). The wedding took place in the parsonage in Sunnanåker, in Ytterlännäs parish. Lars and Brita had a child: Lars Hornaeus (1682–1751) a minister, who married Elisabeth Wattrangia (1682–1743). Lars and Elizabeth had a son: Jöns Hornaeus (1715–1778), a minister who documented the witch trials of his grandfather.

In 1668 a witch panic spread around Sweden, and in 1674 the witch panic reached Torsåker.  Laurentius Christophri Hornaeus presided at the Torsåker witch trials, which became the largest witch trial in Sweden's history.  

Laurentius died on April 27, 1719 in Nordanåker, Ytterlännäs parish. He was buried under the old church in Ytterlännäs where a hatch in the floor between the altar and the door to the sacristy leads to his still preserved grave. Lars Larsson Hornaeus took over his father's pastorate in 1719 and led the congregation until his death in 1751.

References

 Alf Åberg (1989). Häxorna. De stora trolldomsprocesserna i Sverige 1668–1676. Göteborg: Novum Grafiska AB. ISBN 91-24-16385-6

External links
The Torsåker Witch Trial of 1675 and the Clergyman Hornaues
Torsåker witch trials
Laurentius Christophori Hornæus

1645 births
1719 deaths
17th-century Swedish Lutheran priests
18th-century Swedish Lutheran priests
People of the Swedish Empire
Witch hunters
Witch trials in Sweden